

Graphical

Console/terminal-based

Libraries

Summary board

Graphical UI based FTP Servers

Terminal/Console based FTP Servers

See also 
 File Transfer Protocol (FTP)
 Comparison of FTP client software
 FTPS (FTP over SSL/TLS)
 FTP over SSH
 SSH File Transfer Protocol (SFTP)
 Comparison of SSH servers
 Comparison of SSH clients

Notes

External links 
 

FTP servers
FTP servers